John James Rooney (November 29, 1903 – October 26, 1975) was an American lawyer and politician and as a Democratic politician from New York. From 1944 to 1974, he served in the U.S. House of Representatives.

Early life
Rooney was born in Brooklyn in 1903. In 1925, he graduated with a J.D. degree from Fordham University School of Law and practiced law following his admission to the bar the next year. He subsequently served as assistant district attorney in Brooklyn, New York, from 1940 to 1944.

Political career

In 1944, Rooney was elected by special election to the 78th United States Congress, to fill the vacancy left after the death of Thomas H. Cullen. He was re-elected in each subsequent election until opting to retire after the 1974 midterm election. He resigned from his seat on December 31, 1974, a few days before his term was to expire.

He was once called a "frank torchbearer for the so-called Catholic lobby," for his support of American aid to Francisco Franco's regime in Spain.

Death

Rooney died on October 26, 1975, in Washington, D.C.

References

External links

1903 births
1975 deaths
Fordham University School of Law alumni
Politicians from Brooklyn
Democratic Party members of the United States House of Representatives from New York (state)
20th-century American politicians